Thyenula oranjensis is a jumping spider species in the genus Thyenula that lives in South Africa. It was first described by Wanda Wesołowska in 2001.

References

Endemic fauna of South Africa
Salticidae
Spiders described in 2001
Spiders of South Africa